Nadine Labaki ( Nādīn Labikī; born February 18, 1974) is a Lebanese actress, director and activist. Labaki first came into the spotlight as an actress in the early 2000s. Her film-making career began in 2007 after the release of her debut film, Caramel, which premiered at the Cannes 2007 Film Festival. She is known for demonstrating everyday aspects of Lebanese life and covering a range of political issues such as war, poverty, and feminism.  She is the first female Arab director to be nominated for an Oscar in the category for Best Foreign Language Film for Capernaum (2018).

Early life
Labaki was born in Baabdat, Mount Lebanon Governorate, Lebanon, to a Maronite family to Antoine and Antoinette Labaki. Her father is an engineer while her mother is a homemaker. She spent the first seventeen years of her life living in a war-torn environment, until 1991 when the civil war in Lebanon had ended. Early in life, she learned the art of storytelling from her uncle, who was the family hakawati (storyteller). Her grandfather also owned a small theatre in Lebanon where she found her love for film. She began her career with Studio El Fan, a Lebanese talent show, in 1990. The show aired during the 1970s, which continued through to the early 2000s. At the talent show, Labaki won a prize for directing various music video productions.

Labaki obtained a degree in audiovisual studies at Saint Joseph University in Beirut. In 1997, she directed her graduation film, 11 Rue Pasteur, which won the Best Short Film Award at the Biennale of Arab Cinema at the Arab World Institute in Paris. Labaki is unique among her fellow Lebanese and Arab Film Makers in that she was not educated or trained abroad.

In 1998, she attended a workshop in acting at the Cours Florent in Paris. With her sister Caroline Labaki as executive producer, she went on to direct advertisements and music videos for renowned Middle Eastern singers, for which she won several awards. Striving to project the contemporary Lebanese woman, she "created examples of Lebanese women who were very at ease in their bodies."

Career

Director 
In 2003, Labaki's name began to become more popular within the Arab media. 2003 was also the year when she began directing music videos for singer Nancy Ajram. The song, "Akhasmak ah" (Yes, I'll fight you), sparked controversy due to its scenes of sexually suggestive dancing. Ajram's female character, who serves as a waitress to male customers, was seen as inappropriate and too evocative. Labaki defended her script, stating that Ajram was actually portraying an "assertive and powerful female figure". Labaki and Ajram worked to redefine the image of the current Arab woman as feminine, alluring and in control. Ajram continued to collaborate with Labaki on her music videos, "Ya Salam," "Lawn Ouyounak" and "Inta Eih." The three videos were awarded with best music video honors.

In 2005, Labaki took part in the Cannes Film Festival Residence for six months. During that time, she wrote Caramel, her first feature film. In 2006, she directed and played one of the leading roles in Caramel, which showcases a Beirut that most people are not familiar with. Rather than tackle political issues that have plagued Lebanon, she presents a comedy that deals with five Lebanese women in Beirut who gather at a beauty salon and deal with issues related to love, sexuality, tradition, disappointment, and everyday ups and downs. The film premiered at the Directors' Fortnight at the Cannes Film Festival in 2007, which was a commercial success in the summer of that same year. It sold worldwide and collected important prizes at many festivals around the world, garnering Labaki much acclaim both as a director and actress. It also put her on Variety's 10 Directors to Watch list at the Sundance Film Festival. In 2008, the French Ministry of Culture and Communication gave her the Insignia of Chevalier in the Order of Arts and Letters.

In 2010, Labaki directed and starred in her second feature film, Where Do We Go Now?  The film humorously tackles a delicate subject about a war-ravaged Middle Eastern village in which Muslim and Christian women try to keep their men from starting a religious war. The idea for this film first came about when Labaki was pregnant with her son in 2008. At that time, Lebanon was at the brink of its most violent turmoil in decades. The inter-religious conflict led to outbursts in the streets of Beirut. Labaki speaks of friends becoming enemies due to religious differences. Preparing for motherhood, she began to ponder what extreme lengths mothers would go to to prevent their sons from obtaining arms and taking to the streets to fight. This one idea sparked the narrative of this film, in which an entire town of women begin a mission to prevent the men from brutally killing each other. The story takes place in Lebanon, although never explicitly stated. Labaki's reasoning for this was that  "the film is universal... this conflict does not only happen in Lebanon. I see it everywhere . . . We are scared of each other as human beings." Similar to Caramel, her second feature casts non-professional actors. In effort to heighten the reality, Labaki states that "normal people deserve to be on the big screen."

The film premiered at the Cannes Film Festival in the Un Certain Regard category in 2011. The film won the Cadillac people's choice award at the Toronto International Film Festival. It also collected many other awards in festivals around the world, like Cannes Film Festival, San Sebastián International Film Festival, Stockholm Film Festival, and Doha Tribeca Film Festival. The film was also nominated for the best foreign film at the Critics Choice Awards in Los Angeles. During its opening weekend, the film hit the largest ever admissions total for an Arabic-speaking film in Lebanon, amounting to 21,475 admissions for a total of $153,358.

In late 2013, Nadine Labaki started work on her third feature film called Capernaum which was selected to compete for the Palme d'Or at the 2018 Cannes Film Festival. The film tells the story of a 12-year-old boy living in the slums of Beirut. He strives to sue his parents for bringing him into a world of suffering and negligence of children. Labaki wrote the screenplay along with Jihad Hojeily, Michelle Kesrouani, Georges Khabbaz and her husband, Khaled Mouzanar. Mouzanar further produced the film and composed the music. The title Capernaum, means 'chaos'.

For three years prior to writing, Labaki extensively researched the city's children to gather accounts of their experiences, stories and pasts. She used mostly non-professional actors for this film, including lead child actor Zain Al Rafeea, who was found in one of the slums playing with friends, a Syrian refugee himself. Although a rather anti-classical style of filmmaking, Labaki deems her system as "very organic." She strived to provide these "forgotten children" with a voice and use her cinematic tools to ignite a lasting change.

Labaki's style of cinematography uses cinematic conventions, such as illuminations, atmosphere lighting, and silence to help convey the meaning in her films. Despite the often dangerous political situations, Labaki continues to write and direct films that do not focus on conflict.

Capernaum won the Jury Prize at Cannes, and Labaki won Best Directing at the 12th Asia Pacific Screen Awards.

She was selected to be on the jury for the Un Certain Regard section of the 2015 Cannes Film Festival.

Following the success of Capernaum, Creative Artists Agency (CAA)  signed Labaki in all areas, but she continues to be represented in France by Art Media Agency.

Her movie Capernaum was nominated in the foreign-language Oscars category, which was a first for a female director in 2019. She is the first female Arab director to ever be nominated for an Oscar for Best Foreign Language Film.

In collaboration with the UNHCR and UNICEF, Zain Al Rafeea and his family have been resettled in Norway. He and his siblings are attending school for the first time in their lives with a hope of regaining their childhoods. This, says Labaki, is the greatest reward.

Actress
Nadine Labaki started acting in short films during the early 2000s. She starred in Zeina Durra's The Seventh Dog. The work won the audience award at the Circuito Of Venice International Short Film Festival in 2006.

In 2006, Labaki starred in "Bosta," a Lebanese musical comedy. The film was a box office success, outgrossing "Harry Potter and the Goblet of Fire."

In the same year, Labaki acted in her first feature film, Caramel.

Labaki starred in Stray Bullet, directed by Georges Hachem in 2010.

She appears in the Moroccan production Rock The Casbah, directed by Laila Marrakchi, alongside actors Hiam Abbas and Lubna Azabal.

She has also performed in her films Where Do We Go Now? and Capernaum.

Labaki often casts herself in her movies. She feels, "When I act with the people I cast, they feel more comfortable. I like to improvise a lot, and when I am in the film, it's like directing the scene from the inside."

Jury
In 2021, she was selected as jury member at 11th Beijing International Film Festival for Tiantan Awards.

Themes and directing style

Themes 
Growing up during the Lebanese Civil War, Labaki's films are informed by her experiences of political unrest in her home country, often exploring themes of violence and trauma.

Labaki's films challenge apathy towards important issues, such as the refugee crisis and poverty. Though themes of war and tragedy are prevalent in Labaki's works, so is humor. Her films cover the Lebanese Civil War and the lasting impacts it had on the country. Her experiences impacted Labaki personally, as well as how it shaped her film-making. As a director, she feels that she has to do something good for her country. She then decided that talking about problems such as poverty and the refugee crisis is important. FF2 Media covered a Q&A with Labaki in 2018 about her movie Capernaum, which received an Oscar nomination for Best Foreign Language Film of the Year (as well as 34 other wins and 46 other nominations). While trying to brainstorm concepts for the script, her team came up with ideas that she wanted to include, such as "child labor, migrant labor rights, children's rights, the absurdity of having to have the papers to prove that you exist, the absurdity of borders, and early marriage". She believes that “Cinema can be a way to [create] change.” She has stated that politics and art are intertwined and that her films are her own “way of revolt”. According to Labaki, "sometimes, a line in a film, or a scene can make you think about yourself, about your decisions. By touching your hearts films can offer hope more than politics". Labaki's films have no solutions for the issues Lebanon faces, but she hopes that her films will "simply shake audiences out of their chronic lethargy". She has stated that her film-making and activism are the same, believing that cinema can effect social change.

Another common theme in her work is feminism and the female narrative. She does this by focusing on the everyday lives of women in the Middle East in her films.

Through her films, Nadine Labaki connects themes from the Arab world and the Western world. Her transnational feminism highlights ordinary women affected by complex realities deeply rooted in decades of political turmoil.

Style 
Labaki's films are often cast with non-professional actors. She often finds men, women, and children who live in the real neighborhoods shown on screen where they re-enact scenes from their own experiences, often in some of Beirut's grittiest slums. Labaki does this to make the film as realistic as possible. Labaki is also known for spending long periods to research and pick the cast for her films. She immerses herself in the lives of her subjects and spent four years researching her subject and the mistreated children in Beirut. For her film Capernaum, she gave her actors minimal direction and used hand-held cameras to capture life in the streets of Lebanon. For her film Caramel, she spent almost a year searching for women who resembled her characters. She purposely did not want professional actors, she explained, and the spontaneity of each authenticates the plot of women supporting each other as they cope with their problems. The filmmaker amassed months of raw footage, which she later edited down to just over two hours.

Labaki states that she was inspired by the photo of a 3-year-old Syrian refugee whose lifeless body sparked outrage around the world. Stating, "I remember thinking if this child could talk, what would he say, and how would he address the adults that killed him?" she says. "I wanted to become their voice, their vehicle for them to express themselves."

In a 2012 interview with Jan Lisa Huttner from FF2 Media, Labaki said: "I have a problem with injustice. I have a problem with seeing the wrong things around me and just not saying anything about them". She likes to address relevant issues and portray them through her art, be it acting, directing, or even dance. Her movie Where Do We Go Now?  heavily incorporates dance, and in the same interview with FF2 Media, she mentioned that she has a background of being a dancer.

Personal life 
Labaki is multilingual, fluent in Arabic, French, English and Italian. In 2007, she married Lebanese musician and composer Khaled Mouzanar. In 2009, Nadine Labaki gave birth to her first boy, Walid. Seven years later (2016), Labaki gave birth to a daughter, Mayroun.

In 2016, Labaki received an honorary degree from the American University of Beirut and was the speaker at the 150th Commencement Ceremony.

Politics 
Nadine Labaki was a candidate on the list of the new political movement Beirut Madinati for the capital's May 2016 local election. Beirut Madinati focuses on social justice and the good of the public utilizing a diverse group of citizens as representatives.

Despite achieving about 40% of the popular vote, the movement lost against its opponent, the 'Beirutis' list' supported by Saad Hariri, in all 6 out of 12 wards, but did not gain a single seat under the election's one-district First-past-the-post system.

Filmography

As a director
Caramel or Sukkar Banat. Premiered at the 2007 Cannes Film Festival. (See Caramel for a list of awards and nominations).
Where Do We Go Now? released and premiered as part of the Un Certain Regard section at the 2011 Cannes Film Festival.
Rio, I Love You segment: O Milagre
Capernaum (2018) premiered at Cannes 2018 in the feature film competition, and won the jury prize, along with many other awards from other international festivals, among them the Cinema for Peace Most Valuable Movie of the year Award in 2019.

As an actress
 Ramad (Ashes) – a short film by Joanna Hadjithomas and Khalil Joreige (2003)
  The Seventh Dog – a short film by Zeina Durra
 Non métrage Libanais (2003) – a short film by Wissam Smayra; Role as Nina
 Bosta – a long feature by Philippe Aractingi; Role as Alia
 Caramel or Sukkar Banat (2007) – Role as Layale
 Stray Bullet (2010) – Role as Noha
 Al Abb Wal Gharib The Father And The Foreigner (2010) by Ricky Tognazzi
 Where Do We Go Now? (2011) – Role as Amale
 Rock The Casbah (2013)
 Mea Culpa (2014)
 Rio, I Love You (2014) – Role as self
 La Rançon de la gloire (2014)
 The Idol (2015)
 Capernaum (2018) – Role as Nadine
 1982 (2019) – Yasmine
 Costa Brava, Lebanon (2021)
 Perfect Strangers (2022)

|-
! scope="row 1" | 2020
| Bodil Awards
| Best Non-American Film
| Capernaum
|
|
|-
! scope="row 2" | 2020
| Danish Film Awards (Robert)
| Best Non-English Language Film
| Capernaum
|
|
|-
! scope="row 3" | 2020
| Guldbagge Awards
| Best Foreign Film
| Capernaum
|
|
|-
! scope="row 4" | 2019
| Academy Awards
| Best Foreign Language Film of the Year
| Capernaum
|
|
|-
! scope="row 5" | 2019
| Golden Globes
| Best Motion Picture – Foreign Language
| Capernaum
|
|
|-
! scope="row 6" | 2019
| BAFTA Awards
| Best Film Not in the English Language
| Capernaum
|
|
|-
! scope="row 7" | 2019
| Alliance of Women Film Journalists
| Best Non-English Language Film
| Capernaum
|
|
|-
! scope="row 8" | 2019
| Alliance of Women Film Journalists
| Best Woman Director
| Capernaum
|
|
|-
! scope="row 9" | 2019
| Amanda Awards, Norway
| Best Foreign Feature Film
| Capernaum
| 
|
|-
! scope="row 10" | 2019
| Awards Circuit Community Awards
| Best Foreign Language Film
| Capernaum
| 
|
|-
! scope="row 11" | 2019
| César Awards, France
| Best Foreign Film
| Capernaum
| 
|
|-
! scope="row 12" | 2019
| FEST International Film Festival
| Best Director
| Capernaum
| 
|
|-
! scope="row 13" | 2019
| Globes de Cristal Awards, France
| Best Foreign Film 
| Capernaum
| 
|
|-
! scope="row 14" | 2019
| Kinema Junpo Awards
| Best Foreign Film 
| Capernaum
| 
|
|-
! scope="row 15" | 2019
| Latino Entertainment Journalists Association Film Awards
| Best Foreign Language Film 
| Capernaum
| 
|
|-
! scope="row 16" | 2019
| Palm Springs International Film Festival
| Best Foreign Language Film 
| Capernaum
| 
|
|-
! scope="row 17" | 2019
| Rotterdam International Film Festival
| IFFR Audience Award
| Capernaum
| 
|
|-
! scope="row 18" | 2019
| The Lebanese Movie Awards
| Best Lebanese Director – Motion Picture
| Capernaum
| 
|
|-
! scope="row 19" | 2019
| The Lebanese Movie Awards
| Best Ensemble Cast In A Lebanese Motion Picture
| Capernaum
|
|
|-
! scope="row 20" | 2019
| The Lebanese Movie Awards
| Best Writing In A Lebanese Motion Picture
| Capernaum
| 
|
|-
! scope="row 21" | 2019
| Vilnius International Film Festival
| Best Feature Film
| Capernaum
| 
|
|-
! scope="row 22" | 2019
| Young Artist Awards
| Humanitarian Award
| Capernaum
| 
|
|-
! scope="row 23" | 2018
| Adelaide Film Festival
| Best Feature
| Capernaum
|
|
|-
! scope="row 24" | 2018
| Antalya Golden Orange Film Festival
| Best Film – Youth Jury Film Prize 
| Capernaum
| 
|
|-
! scope="row 25" | 2018
| Antalya Golden Orange Film Festival
| Best Film – Golden Orange
| Capernaum
| 
|
|-
! scope="row 26" | 2018
| Asia Pacific Screen Awards
| Achievement in Directing
| Capernaum
|
|
|-
! scope="row 27" | 2018
| British Independent Film Awards
| Best International Independent Film
| Capernaum
|
|
|-
! scope="row 28" | 2018
| Calgary International Film Festival
| US/International Narrative Feature
| Capernaum
| 
|
|-
! scope="row 29" | 2018
| Calgary International Film Festival
| Fan Favourite Award
| Capernaum
|  
|
|-
! scope="row 30" | 2018
| Cannes Film Festival
| Jury Prize
| Capernaum
|  
|
|-
! scope="row 31" | 2018
| Cannes Film Festival
| Prize of the Ecumenical Jury
| Capernaum
|  
| 
|-
! scope="row 32" | 2018
| Cannes Film Festival
| Prix de la citoyenneté
| Capernaum
| 
| 
|-
! scope="row 33" | 2018
| Cannes Film Festival
| Palme d'Or
| Capernaum
|  
|
|-
! scope="row 34" | 2018
| Festival international du cinema francophone en Acadie
| Best Feature Film
| Capernaum
|  
| 
|-
! scope="row 35" | 2018
| Festival international du cinema francophone en Acadie
| Public Choice Award
| Capernaum
| 
|
|-
! scope="row 36" | 2018
| Ghent International Film Festival
| North Sea Port Audience Award
| Capernaum
|  
|
|-
! scope="row 37" | 2018
| Melbourne International Film Festival
| Best Narrative Feature
| Capernaum
| 
|
|-
! scope="row 38" | 2018
| Mill Valley Film Festival
| World Cinema
| Capernaum
| 
|
|-
! scope="row 39" | 2018
| Montréal Festival of New Cinema
| Peace Award
| Capernaum
| 
| 
|-
! scope="row 40" | 2018
| Norwegian International Film Festival
| Best Film
| Capernaum
|  
|
|-
! scope="row 41" | 2018
| Sarajevo Film Festival
| Best Feature Film
| Capernaum
|  
|
|-
! scope="row 42" | 2018
| St. Louis International Film Festival
| TV5MONDE Award for Best International Film
| Capernaum
| 
| 
|-
! scope="row 43" | 2018
| Stockholm Film Festival
| Best Screenplay
| Capernaum
| 
|
|-
! scope="row 44" | 2018
| Stockholm Film Festival
| Best Film
| Capernaum
| 
|
|-
! scope="row 45" | 2018
| São Paulo International Film Festival
| Best Feature Film
| Capernaum
| 
|
|-
! scope="row 45" | 2018
| São Paulo International Film Festival
| Best Foreign Fiction
| Capernaum
| 
|
|-
! scope="row 46" | 2017
| Chicago Film Critics Association Awards
| Best Foreign Language Fiction
| Capernaum
| 
|
|-
! scope="row 47" | 2012
| Murex D'Or
| Best Lebanese Film Award
| Where Do We Go Now? 
| 
|
|-
! scope="row 48" | 2011
| Cannes Film Festival
| Prize of the Ecumenical Jury – Special Mention
| Where Do We Go Now?
| 
|
|-
! scope="row 49" | 2011
| Cannes Film Festival
| François Chalais Award
| Where Do We Go Now?
| 
|
|-
! scope="row 50" | 2011
| Cannes Film Festival
| Un Certain Regard Award
| Where Do We Go Now?
| 
|
|-
! scope="row 51" | 2011
| Oslo Films from the South Festival
| Audience Award
| Where Do We Go Now?
| 
|
|-
! scope="row 52" | 2011
| Oslo Films from the South Festival
| Silver Mirror Award
| Where Do We Go Now?
| 
|
|-
! scope="row 53" | 2011
| San Sebastián International Film Festival
| Best European Film
| Where Do We Go Now?
| 
|
|-
! scope="row 54" | 2011
| Stockholm Film Festival
| Best Script
| Where Do We Go Now?
| 
|
|-
! scope="row 55" | 2011
| Stockholm Film Festival
| Best Film
| Where Do We Go Now?
| 
|
|-
! scope="row 56" | 2011
| Toronto International Film Festival
| People's Choice Award
| Where Do We Go Now?
| 
|
|-
! scope="row 54" | 2009
| Argentinean Film Critics Association Awards
| Best Foreign Film, Not in the Spanish Language
| Caramel
| 
|
|-
! scope="row 55" | 2008
| Dublin Film Critics Circle Awards
| Best Actress
| Caramel
| 
|
|-
! scope="row 57" | 2008
| Dublin Film Critics Circle Awards
| Breakthrough Artist
| Caramel
| 
|
|-
! scope="row 58" | 2007
| Asia Pacific Screen Awards
| Achievement in Directing
| Caramel
| 
|
|-
! scope="row 59" | 2007
| Asia Pacific Screen Awards
| Best Performance by an Actress
| Caramel
| 
|
|-
! scope="row 60" | 2007
| Cannes Film Festival
| Golden Camera
| Caramel
| 
|
|-
! scope="row 61" | 2007
| Cannes Film Festival
| C.I.C.A.E. Award
| Caramel
| 
|
|-
! scope="row 62" | 2007
| Oslo Films from the South Festival
| Best Feature
| Caramel
| 
|
|-
! scope="row 63" | 2007
| San Sebastián International Film Festival
| Audience Award
| Caramel
| 
|
|-
! scope="row 64" | 2007
| San Sebastián International Film Festival
| Youth Jury Award
| Caramel
| 
|
|-
! scope="row 65" | 2007
| San Sebastián International Film Festival
| Sebastiane Award
| Caramel
| 
|
|-
! scope="row 66" | 2007
| Stockholm Film Festival
| FIPRESCI Prize
| Caramel
| 
|
|-
! scope="row 67" | 2007
| Paris Biennal of Arab Cinema
| Best Short Film – Fiction 
| 11 Rue Pasteur
| 
|
|}

Other work 
In 2014, Labaki was the goodwill ambassador for the bilingual and multimedia campaign produced by The Brave Heart Fund (BHF). Based out of the Children's Heart Center at the American University of Beirut Medical Center, the BHF creates awareness and helps to fund operations and procedures for underprivileged children with Congenital Heart Disease.

References

External links 
 
 Official fan page
 

1974 births
Living people
Lebanese women film directors
21st-century Lebanese actresses
Lebanese film directors
Lebanese Maronites
Lebanese screenwriters
Women screenwriters
Female music video directors
Saint Joseph University alumni
Lebanese film actresses
Lebanese music video directors
People from Matn District
Lebanese feminists
Asia Pacific Screen Award winners